Epia muscosa is a moth in the family Bombycidae first described by Arthur Gardiner Butler in 1878. It is found from Mexico to the Amazon region.

References

Bombycidae